1666... Théâtre Bizarre is the second studio album by the French progressive death metal band Misanthrope. It is sung in English on tracks 1, 3, 5 and 8; French on track 2, 4, 6, 7, and 11; and German on track 10.

Track listing

 "Gargantuan Decline" – 7:21
 "Courtisane syphillitique" – 5:39
 "1666... Théâtre bizarre" – 5:38 
 "L'autre hiver" – 6:30 
 "Pirouetting Through the Gloom" – 7:37
 "Aphrodite marine" – 4:22
 "Medieval Embroidery" – 5:35
 "Mylène" – 5:26
 "Trumpets of Hypochondria" – 4:37 
 "Schattengesang" – 6:16
 "La dernière pierre" – 8:09

Personnel 

Philippe Courtois de l'Arggilière – guitar, vocals
Jean-Jacques Moréac – bass, 12 string acoustic guitar
Alexandre Iskandar – keyboards

References

External links
1666...Théâtre Bizarre @ Encyclopaedia Metallum

1995 albums
Misanthrope (band) albums
Holy Records albums